Sox Appeal was a reality television series that aired on NESN in 2007 and 2008. It was a Boston Red Sox-themed dating game show that followed a fan during three, two-inning long blind dates that took place over the course of a Red Sox game. During the seventh inning stretch, the fan chose the date they wanted to continue dating. The date, however, could choose not to continue the date.

The series was a collaboration between NESN and Scout Productions, producers of Queer Eye for the Straight Guy. The music was composed by Dow Brain and Brad Young of Underground Productions, Inc.

The series premiere featured Garrett Lucash, a former national champion pairs skater.

The second season premiered on August 3, 2008. For the second season, former New England Patriots player Larry Izzo was added as the host of a post-date interview segment. Also, a "Daters' Dugout" was added in the second season, where the competing daters must stand next to each other during the game in Fenway Park's right field roof deck standing room section to strategize and challenge each other.

References

External links
 

2000s American reality television series
2007 American television series debuts
2008 American television series endings
American dating and relationship reality television series
New England Sports Network original programming
Boston Red Sox